Bailey County Electric Cooperative Association is a rural utility cooperative headquartered in Muleshoe, Texas.

The cooperative was formed in September 1938 and energized the first  of line (serving 362 customers, of which as of 2007 five are still members) in November 1939.

The cooperative's territory includes portions of Bailey, Castro, Cochran, Lamb, and Parmer counties, all located in the South Plains region of Texas near its border with New Mexico.

External links
 Bailey County Electric Cooperative

Companies based in Texas
Electric cooperatives in Texas
Bailey County, Texas
Castro County, Texas
Cochran County, Texas
Lamb County, Texas
Parmer County, Texas